Mechanical brake stretch wrappers are manual stretch wrapping systems which consist of a simple structure supporting a roll of film to be stretched and a mechanical brake which acts on the film roll, creating resistance to turning and stretching the film as it is fed out.

The amount of braking is often variable by means of either a knob or a lever system.  The support structure is most commonly a base paired with a handle, but recently pole wrappers have been introduced providing a more ergonomic design.

References

Books
 Yam, K. L., "Encyclopedia of Packaging Technology", John Wiley & Sons, 2009, 

Packaging machinery